A10, A.10 or A-10 most often refers to:
 Fairchild Republic A-10 Thunderbolt II, a U.S. close ground support attack aircraft 
 Atlantic 10 Conference

A10, A.10 or A-10 may also refer to:

Transport 

 List of A10 roads
 A10 class (disambiguation), rail locomotives
 Arrows A10, a 1987 British racing car
 Ascari A10, a British car
 Bundesautobahn 10, also called Berliner Ring
 Route A10, a London bus route

Aviation 

 Aero A.10, a Czech biplane airliner
 AmeriPlanes Mitchell Wing A-10, an ultralight aircraft
 Antares A-10 Solo, a Ukrainian ultralight trike design
 Breda A.10, a 1928 Italian single-seat fighter-trainer prototype
 Fiat A.10, a World War I Italian aero engine

Military 

 10th Artillery Regiment (Sweden), in the list of Swedish artillery regiments
 Aggregate 10, a German World War II rocket in the Aggregate rocket family
 Cruiser Mk II, also known by its General Staff designation "A10", a British cruiser tank of World War II
 , a British A-class submarine

Science and technology 

 British NVC community A10 (Polygonum amphibium community), a British Isles plant community
 HLA-A10, a broad antigen serogroup of the Human MHC HLA-A
 Homeobox A10, a human gene
 Subfamily A10, a Rhodopsin-like receptors subfamily

Hardware and software 

 A10 chipset, mainly used in Android tablet computers
 AMD A10, an accelerated processing unit from AMD
 Apple A10, a 64-bit system on a chip
 Samsung Galaxy A10, smartphone released in 2019
 Sony NW-A10, a Walkman digital audio player released in 2014

Sports and games 

 A-10 Attack!, a combat flight simulator for the Apple Macintosh computer
 A-10 Cuba!, a flight simulator computer game
 A-10 Tank Killer, a flight simulation computer game for Amiga and DOS platforms
 A10 World Series, a proposed new global motorsport series
 English Opening, Encyclopaedia of Chess Openings code

Other uses 

 A10 Networks, U.S. computer network company
 A10 – new European architecture, an architecture magazine
 A10, an ISO 216 paper size
 A10, the 10 acceding countries of the 2004 enlargement of the European Union
 A10, the Metropolitan Police Service anti-corruption branch